Saarenmaa is a neighbourhood of Jyväskylä, Finland. It is a small, rural part of Jyväskylä, located in the former Jyväskylän maalaiskunta. Despite its distance from the major built-up area, it is officially a neighbourhood in the Palokka-Puuppola ward.

The road 16687 (Saarenmaantie) connects Saarenmaa to Palokka and through it to Jyväskylä proper.

School 
Saarenmaa used to have its own school encompassing grades 1-4, which was attended by children from Saarenmaa, Vertaala and Lintukangas. The school was closed in August 2020 due to poor indoor air quality as the local government of Jyväskylä agreed that repairing the school would be too costly. The children were moved to a newer school in Savulahti.

References

Neighbourhoods of Jyväskylä